American Roulette is the fifth studio album by American country musician Danny O'Keefe released in 1977 on Warner Bros. Records.

Track listing 
 "The Runaway" - 4:23
 "Islands" - 3:34
 "On Discovering A Missing Person" - 4:15
 "The Hereafter" - 3:45
 "You Look Just Like A Girl Again" - 4:20
 "All My Friends" - 4:11
 "Plastic Saddle" - 3:13
 "In Northern California (Where The Palm Tree Meets The Pine)" - 3:23
 "American Roulette" - 3:34
 "Just Jones" - 3:20

Personnel 
Credits for American Roulette adapted from liner notes.

 Roger Bethelmy - drums
 Ollie E. Brown - conductor, congas
 John Court - guitar
 Laudir DeOliveira - percussion
 Bobbye Hall - conductor, congas
 John Hobbs - keyboards, piano, electric piano
 Charlie Irwin - organ
 Charlie "Fingers" Irwin - keyboards, organ
 Roger Kellaway - keyboards
 King Errisson - conductor, congas
 David Lindley - fiddle, rhythm guitar, steel guitar, vocals, background vocals
 Gary Mallaber - drums
 Vic McAlpin - composer
 Reggie McBride - bass
 Vince Melamed - keyboards, piano, organ
 Mike Melvoin - piano
 Randy Nicklaus - engineer
 Danny O'Keefe - composer, guitar, primary artist, vocals
 Dave Parlato - bass, drums, piano
 Steven Schaeffer - drums
 Tom Scott - saxophone, wind
 Scott Strong - guitar, rhythm guitar
 Alvin Taylor - drums
 Kenny Vance - producer, background vocals
 Peter Woodford - guitar

References 

1977 albums
Warner Records albums
Country albums by American artists